The Swedish Heritage Center is a museum of Swedish memorabilia located at 301 N. Charde in Oakland, Nebraska. The museum displays artifacts brought by Swedish pioneers, including Swedish crystal, linens, and needlework.

See also 
 Swedes in Omaha, Nebraska

References

External links
The Swedish Heritage Center

1989 establishments in Nebraska
Ethnic museums in Nebraska
Oakland, Nebraska
Swedish-American culture in Nebraska
Museums established in 1989
Swedish-American museums
Museums in Burt County, Nebraska